Myrat Annaýew (born 6 May 1993) is a Turkmen professional footballer who plays for Altyn Asyr and Turkmenistan as forward.

International career
Annaýew made his senior debut for Turkmenistan against Qatar. He was included in Turkmenistan's squad for the 2019 AFC Asian Cup in the United Arab Emirates.

He played for Turkmenistan national futsal team at 2020 AFC Futsal Championship qualification.

Career statistics

International
Statistics accurate as of match played 13 January 2019

References

External links 
 
 

1993 births
Living people
Turkmenistan footballers
Association football forwards
Turkmenistan international footballers
FC Ahal players
2019 AFC Asian Cup players
Men's futsal players